The Nunnock River, a perennial stream of the Bega River catchment, is located in the Monaro region of New South Wales, Australia.

Course and features
The river descends  over its  course.

See also

 List of rivers of Australia
 List of rivers of New South Wales (L–Z)
 Rivers of New South Wales

References

External links
 

Rivers of New South Wales